Newspeak is the fictional language of Oceania, a totalitarian superstate that is the setting of the 1949 dystopian novel Nineteen Eighty-Four, by George Orwell. In the novel, the Party created Newspeak to meet the ideological requirements of Ingsoc (English Socialism) in Oceania. Newspeak is a controlled language of simplified grammar and restricted vocabulary designed to limit the individual's ability to think and articulate "subversive" concepts such as personal identity, self-expression, and free will. Such concepts are criminalized as thoughtcrime since they contradict the prevailing Ingsoc orthodoxy.

In "The Principles of Newspeak", the appendix to the novel, Orwell explains that Newspeak follows most of the rules of English grammar, yet is a language characterised by a continually diminishing vocabulary; complete thoughts are reduced to simple terms of simplistic meaning. The political contractions of Newspeak—Ingsoc (English Socialism), Minitrue (Ministry of Truth), Miniplenty (Ministry of Plenty)—are described by Orwell as similar to real examples of German and Russian contractions in the 20th century. Like Nazi (Nationalsozialist), Gestapo (Geheime Staatspolizei), politburo (Political Bureau of the Central Committee of the Communist Party of the Soviet Union), Comintern (Communist International), kolkhoz (collective farm), and Komsomol (communist youth union), the contractions in Newspeak, often syllabic abbreviations, are supposed to have a political function already in virtue of their abbreviated structure itself: nice-sounding and easily pronounceable, their purpose is to mask all ideological content from the speaker.

The word Newspeak is sometimes used in contemporary political debate as an allegation that one tries to introduce new meanings of words to suit one's agenda.

Orwell and Newspeak
Orwell was interested in linguistic questions and questions pertaining to the function and change of language. This can be seen in his essay "Politics and the English Language" (1946) as well as in the Appendix to Nineteen Eighty-Four. As in "Politics and the English Language", the perceived decline and decadence of the English Language is a central theme in Nineteen Eighty-Four and Newspeak. In the essay  Orwell criticises standard English, with its perceived dying metaphors, pretentious diction, and high-flown rhetoric, which he would later satirise in the meaningless words of doublespeak, the product of unclear reasoning. The conclusion thematically reiterates linguistic decline: "I said earlier that the decadence of our language is probably curable. Those who deny this may argue that language merely reflects existing social conditions, and that we cannot influence its development, by any direct tinkering with words or constructions."

Orwell's main objection against this decline of the English language is not so much based on aesthetic grounds, but rather that for him the linguistic decline goes hand-in-hand with a decline of thought, the real possibility of manipulation of speakers as well as listeners and eventually political chaos. The recurring theme in Nineteen Eighty-Four of a connection between authoritarian regimes and (authoritarian) language is already found in "Politics and the English Language": 

Newspeak is a constructed language, of planned phonology, grammar, and vocabulary, like Basic English, in which Orwell showed interest while working at the BBC during the Second World War (1939–1945), but soon came to see the disadvantages of. Newspeak has considerable similarities to the system  of Basic English proposed by Charles Kay Ogden in 1930. Basic ('British  American  Scientific International  Commercial') English was a controlled language and  designed to be an easy-to-learn English with only 850 core words. Like Newspeak, the Basic vocabulary is classified into three categories, two of them with two subcategories. The classification systems, however, do not coincide.

Principles
The political purpose of Newspeak is to eliminate the expression of the shades of meaning inherent in ambiguity and nuance from Oldspeak (Standard English). In order to reduce the language's function of communication, Newspeak uses concepts of simple construction, such as pleasure vs. pain and happiness vs. sadness. Additionally, goodthink and crimethink linguistically reinforce the State's totalitarian dominance of the people of Oceania. The Party's long-term goal with regard to the new language is for every member of the Party and society, except the Proles—the working-class of Oceania—to exclusively communicate in Newspeak, by A.D. 2050.

In Newspeak, English root words function as both nouns and verbs, which reduce the vocabulary available for the speaker to communicate meaning. For example, think is both a noun and a verb, thus, the word thought is not functionally required to communicate the concepts of thought in Newspeak and therefore is not in the Newspeak vocabulary.

As personal communication, Newspeak is to be spoken in staccato rhythm, using words that are short and easy to pronounce. The Party intends to make speech physically automatic and intellectually unconscious in order to diminish the possibility of critical thought occurring to the speaker. English words of comparative and superlative meanings and irregular spellings were simplified into regular spellings; thus, better becomes gooder and best becomes goodest. The prefixes plus- and doubleplus- are used for emphasis (for example, pluscold meaning "very cold" and doublepluscold meaning "extremely cold"). Adjectives are formed by adding the suffix –ful to a root-word, e.g. goodthinkful means "Orthodox in thought."; while adverbs are formed by adding the suffix –wise, e.g. goodthinkwise means "In an orthodox manner".

Thought control
The intellectual purpose of Newspeak is to make all anti-Ingsoc thoughts "literally unthinkable" in terms of words. As constructed, Newspeak's vocabulary communicates the exact expression of sense and meaning that a member of the Party could wish to express, while excluding secondary denotations and connotations, eliminating the ways of indirect thinking that allow a word to have additional meanings. The linguistic simplification of Oldspeak into Newspeak was realised with neologisms, the elimination of ideologically undesirable words, and the elimination of the politically unorthodox meanings of words.

The word free still existed in Newspeak, but only to communicate the absence of something, e.g. "The dog is free from lice" or "This field is free of weeds". The word could not denote free will, because intellectual freedom was no longer supposed to exist in Oceania. The limitations of Newspeak's vocabulary enabled the Party to effectively control the population's minds, by allowing the user only a very narrow range of spoken and written thought; hence, words such as: crimethink (thought crime), doublethink (accepting contradictory beliefs), and Ingsoc communicated only their surface meanings.

In the story of Nineteen Eighty-Four, the lexicologist character Syme discusses his editorial work on the latest edition of the Newspeak Dictionary:

Vocabulary
Newspeak words are classified by three distinct classes: the A, B, and C vocabularies.

The words of the A vocabulary describe the functional concepts of daily life (e.g. eating and drinking, working and cooking). It consists mostly of English words, but they are very small in number compared to English, while for each word, its meanings are "far more rigidly defined" than in English.

The words of the B vocabulary are deliberately constructed for political purposes to convey complex ideas in a simple form. They are compound words and noun-verbs with political significance that are meant to impose and instill upon Oceania's citizens politically correct mental attitudes required by the Party. In the appendix, Orwell explains that the very structure of the B vocabulary (the fact that they are compound words) carries ideological weight. The large amounts of contractions in the B vocabulary—for example, the Ministry of Truth being called Minitrue, the Records department being called Recdep, the Fiction Department being called Ficdep, the Teleprogrammes Department being called Teledep—is not done simply to save time. Like with examples of compound words in the political language of the 20th century—Nazi, Gestapo, Politburo, Comintern, Inprecor, Agitprop, and many others—Orwell remarks that the Party believed that abbreviating a name could "narrowly and subtly" alter a word's meaning. Newspeak is supposed to make this effort a conscious purpose: 

The B words in Newspeak are supposed to sound pleasant, while also being easily pronounceable, in an attempt to make speech on anything political "staccato and monotonous" and, ultimately, mask from the speaker all ideological content. 

The words of the C vocabulary are scientific and technical terms that supplement the linguistic functions of the A and B vocabularies. These words are the same scientific terms in English, but many of them have had their meanings rigidified in order to, just like with the A vocabulary, attempt to prevent speakers from being able to express anti-government thoughts. Distribution of the C vocabulary is limited, because the Party do not want the citizens of Oceania to know more than a select few ways of life or techniques of production. Hence, the Oldspeak word science has no equivalent term in Newspeak; instead, these words are simply treated as specific technical words for speaking of technical fields.

Grammar

Newspeak's grammar is greatly simplifed compared to English. It also has two "outstanding" characteristics: Almost completely interchangeable linguistic functions between the parts of speech (any word could function as a verb, noun, adjective, or adverb), and heavy inflectional regularity in the construction of usages and of words. Inflectional regularity means that most irregular words were replaced with regular words combined with prefixes and suffixes. For example, the preterite and the past participle constructions of verbs are alike, with both ending in –ed. Hence, the Newspeak preterite of the English word steal is stealed, and that of the word think is thinked. Likewise, the past participles of swim, give, bring, speak, and take were, respectively swimmed, gived, bringed, speaked, and taked, with all irregular forms (such as swam, gave, and brought) being eliminated. The auxiliaries (including to be), pronouns, demonstratives, and relatives still inflect irregularly. They mostly follow their use in English, but the word whom and the shall and should tenses were dropped, whom being replaced by who and shall and should by will and would.

Prefixes
 "Un–" is used to indicate negation, as Newspeak has no non-political antonyms. For example, the standard English words warm and hot are replaced by uncold, and the moral concept communicated with the word bad is expressed as ungood. When appended to a verb, the prefix "un–" communicates a negative imperative mood, thus, the Newspeak word unproceed means "do not proceed" in Standard English.
 "Plus–" is an intensifier that replaces very and more; thus, plusgood replaced very good and English words such as great.
 "Doubleplus–" is an intensifier that replaces extremely and superlatives; to that purpose, the Newspeak word doubleplusgood replaced words such as fantastic and excellent.
 "Ante–" is the prefix that replaces before; thus antefilling replaces the English phrase "before filling."
 "Post–" is the prefix that replaces after.

Suffixes
In spoken and written Newspeak, suffixes are also used in the elimination of irregular conjugations:
 "–ful" transforms any word into an adjective, e.g. the English words fast, quick, and rapid are replaced by speedful and slow is replaced by unspeedful.
 "–d" and "–ed" form the past tense of a verb, e.g. ran becomes runned, stole becomes stealed, drove becomes drived, thought becomes thinked, and drank becomes drinked.
 "–er" forms the more comparison of an adjective, e.g. better becomes gooder.
 "–est" forms the most comparison of an adjective, e.g. best becomes goodest.
 "–s" and "–es" transform a noun into its plural form, e.g. men becomes mans, oxen becomes oxes, and lives becomes lifes.
 "–wise" transforms any word into an adverb by eliminating all English adverbs not already ending in "–wise", e.g. quickly becomes speedwise, slowly becomes unspeedwise, carefully becomes carewise, and words like fully, completely, and totally become fullwise.

Therefore, the Oldspeak sentence "He ran extremely quickly" would become "He runned doubleplusspeedwise".

List of Newspeak words

This is a list of Newspeak words known from the novel. It does not include words carried over directly from English with no change in meaning, nor does it include regular uses of the listed affixes (e.g. unbellyfeel) unless they are particularly significant.

The novel says that the Ministry of Truth uses a jargon "not actually Newspeak, but consisting largely of Newspeak words" for its internal memos. As many of the words in this list (e.g. "bb", "upsub") come from such memos, it is not certain whether those words are actually Newspeak.

ante — The prefix that replaces before
artsem — Artificial insemination
bb — Big Brother
bellyfeel — The blind, enthusiastic acceptance of an idea
blackwhite — To accept whatever one is told, regardless of the facts. In the novel, it is described as "...to say that black is white when [the Party says so]" and "...to believe that black is white, and more, to know that black is white, and to forget that one has ever believed the contrary". (See also 2 + 2 = 5)
crimestop — To rid oneself of or fail to understand unorthodox thoughts that go against Ingsoc's ideology
crimethink — Thoughts and concepts that go against Ingsoc such as liberty, equality, and privacy, and also the criminal act of holding such thoughts. Frequently referred to by the standard English “thoughtcrime”.
dayorder — Order of the day
dep — Department
doubleplusgood — The word that replaced Oldspeak words meaning "superlatively good", such as excellent, fabulous, and fantastic
doubleplusungood — The word that replaced Oldspeak words meaning "superlatively bad", such as terrible and horrible
doublethink — The act of simultaneously believing two, mutually contradictory ideas
duckspeak — Automatic, vocal support of political orthodoxies
equal — The same in amount or quantity. Not used in the sense of having equal rights or freedoms.
facecrime — A facial expression which reveals that one has committed thoughtcrime
Ficdep — The Ministry of Truth's Fiction Department
free — The absence and the lack of something. "Intellectually free" and "politically free" have been replaced by crimethinkful.
fullwise — The word that replaces words such as fully, completely, and totally
goodthink — A synonym for "political orthodoxy" and "a politically orthodox thought" as defined by the Party
goodsex — Sexual intercourse only for procreation, without any physical pleasure on the part of the woman, and strictly within marriage
goodwise — The word that replaced well as an adverb
Ingsoc — English Socialism (the political ideology of the Party)
joycamp  — Labour camp
malquoted — Inaccurate representations of the words of Big Brother and of the Party
Miniluv — The Ministry of Love, where the secret police interrogate and torture the enemies of Oceania (torture and brainwashing)
Minipax — The Ministry of Peace, who wage war for Oceania
Miniplenty — The Ministry of Plenty, who keep the population in continual economic hardship (starvation and rationing)
Minitrue — The Ministry of Truth, who manufacture consent by way of lies, propaganda, and distorted historical records, while supplying the proles (proletariat) with synthetic culture and entertainment
Oldspeak — Standard English
oldthink — Ideas from the time before the Party's revolution, such as objectivity and rationalism
ownlife — A person's anti-social tendency to enjoy solitude and individualism
plusgood — The word that replaced Oldspeak words meaning "very good", such as great 
plusungood — The word that replaced "very bad"
Pornosec — The pornography production section (Porno Sector) of the Ministry of Truth's Fiction Department
prolefeed — Popular culture for entertaining Oceania's working class
Recdep — The Ministry of Truth's Records Department, where Winston Smith rewrites historical records so they conform to the Party's agenda
rectify — The Ministry of Truth's euphemism for distorting a historical record
ref — To refer (to someone or something)
sec — Sector
sexcrime — A sexual immorality, such as fornication, adultery, oral sex, and homosexuality; any sex act that deviates from Party directives to use sex only for government approved procreation 
speakwrite — A machine that transcribes speech into text
Teledep — The Ministry of Truth's Telecommunications Department
telescreen — A two-way television set with which the Party spy upon Oceania's population
thinkpol — The Thought Police, the secret police force of Oceania's government
unperson — An executed person whose existence is erased from history and memory
upsub — An upwards submission to higher authority

See also

 2 + 2 = 5
 Authoritarian socialism
 Glossary of Nazi Germany
 Groupthink
Inclusive language
 Language and thought
 LTI – Lingua Tertii Imperii ("The Language of the Third Reich")
 Logocracy
 Philosophy of language
 Sapir–Whorf hypothesis
 Linguistic determinism
 Soviet phraseology
 Un-word of the year

Fiction:
 Ascian language
 Nadsat

Notes

References

Further reading

Burgess, Anthony. Nineteen Eighty-Five. Boston: Little Brown & Co, 1978. . Anthony Burgess discusses the plausibility of Newspeak.
Green, Jonathon. Newspeak: a dictionary of jargon. London, Boston: Routledge & Kegan Paul, 1985, 1984. .
Klemperer, Victor. LTI - Lingua Tertii Imperii: Notizbuch eines Philologen..  Original German language editions.
Klemperer, Victor & Watt, Roderick H. LTI - Lingua Tertii Imperii: A Philologist's Notebook. Lewiston, New York: Edwin Mellen Press, 1997. . An annotated edition of Victor Klemperer's LTI, Notizbuch eines Philologen with English notes and commentary by Roderick H. Watt.
Klemperer, Victor & Brady, Martin (tr.). The language of the Third Reich: LTI - Lingua Tertii Imperii: A Philologist's Notebook. London, UK; New Brunswick, NJ: Athlone Press, 2000.  (alk. paper). Translated by Martin Brady.
Young, John Wesley . Totalitarian Language: Orwell's Newspeak and Its Nazi and Communist Antecedents. Charlottesville: University Press of Virginia, 1991. . John Wesley Young wrote this scholarly work about Newspeak and historical examples of language control.
The Principles of Newspeak
George Orwell's 1984

Censorship
Constructed languages introduced in the 1940s
Controlled English
Fictional elements introduced in 1949
Fictional languages
Historical negationism
Nineteen Eighty-Four
Political linguistics
Propaganda techniques using words
Satire
Words originating in fiction